Veronica Vasicka (born 1975) is a photographer, record label founder, radio and club DJ. She is the founder of Minimal Wave Records, a record label focused on obscure electronic music from the 1970s and 1980s, as well as its sub label Cititrax, a platform for newer artists.

Early life and education
Vasicka was born in New York City to a Uruguayan mother and Czech father. At an early age, she had a passion for music and photography.<ref name=vz>Venus Zine Staff, "The Hottt List 2003", Venus Zine", Issue 18.  Access date: November 30, 2003. </ref>

She attended The Dalton School, and later studied photography at the Rhode Island School of Design, graduating with honors. She returned to New York City and worked as a photographer for :Index Magazine'', and later co-founded East Village Radio.

Career
Inspired by the music she gathered for her weekly two-hour radio show at East Village Radio, Vasicka launched Minimal Wave Records in 2005. She specializes in obscure electronic music, especially new wave, Italo disco, and house music. Her focus is on bringing rare recordings to the public via the record label, as well as her sublabel Cititrax, which features newer bands and classic house reissues.

Vasicka hosts a weekly radio show on East Village Radio and also DJs bi-monthly in various clubs around New York City. In 2010, she compiled "The Minimal Wave Tapes Volume One", released on Stones Throw Records. The follow-up, "The Minimal Wave Tapes Volume Two", was released in 2012.

Currently, Veronica hosts a monthly radio show on NTS Radio.

References

Radio personalities from New York City
Living people
1970s births
Year of birth uncertain
Rhode Island School of Design alumni
American women in business
21st-century American women